Ivaylo Petrov Ivanov is a Bulgarian former professional footballer who played as a goalkeeper .

Honours
CSKA Sofia
Bulgarian League: 2007–08
Bulgarian Supercup: 2006

External links
 Profile at football24.bg

1973 births
Living people
Bulgarian footballers
Footballers from Sofia
Association football goalkeepers
First Professional Football League (Bulgaria) players
Cypriot First Division players
PFC Beroe Stara Zagora players
PFC Levski Sofia players
PFC CSKA Sofia players
AEK Larnaca FC players
PFC Cherno More Varna players
Bulgarian expatriate footballers
Bulgarian expatriate sportspeople in Cyprus
Expatriate footballers in Cyprus